Neukölln (formerly Rixdorf), until 1920 an independent city, is an inner-city district of Berlin in the homonymous borough (Bezirk) of Neukölln, including the historic village of Alt-Rixdorf and numerous Gründerzeit apartment blocks. With 166,714 inhabitants (2018) the Ortsteil is the most densely populated of Berlin. It was originally characterized by mostly working-class inhabitants and later a relatively high percentage of immigrants, especially of Turkish and Russian descent, but since the turn of the millennium an influx of students, creatives, and western immigrants has led to gentrification.

Geography 
Neukölln lies on the geological border between the shallow Berliner Urstromtal glacial valley and the Tempelhofer Berge, which are situated in the northernmost region of the Teltow ground moraine plateau, rising to the south of Hermannplatz, in what is mostly the typical low-lying marshy woodlands with a mainly flat topography of the North European Plain.

Location 
The district is situated south-east of the Berlin city center, in the north of the Neukölln borough, adjacent to the district of Kreuzberg (in the Friedrichshain-Kreuzberg borough) at the Landwehrkanal, and the streets  and Kottbusser Damm. It also borders with the districts Alt-Treptow, Plänterwald and Baumschulenweg (all part of Treptow-Köpenick) in the east, and Tempelhof (in Tempelhof-Schöneberg) in the west, separated by the parks Volkspark Hasenheide and Tempelhofer Feld, the vast field of the former Tempelhof Airport, now a popular recreation area. In the south, the Stadtring motorway and the Neukölln Ship and Britz canals form the border with the Britz and Baumschulenweg districts.

Subdivisions

Neighborhoods 

Neukölln is divided into nine official neighborhoods (Kieze or Stadtquartiere, officially called Ortslagen), among them the historical sites of Neukölln's foundation south-east of the district's geographical center, Richardplatz-Süd to the north-west, and Böhmisch-Rixdorf to the south-east, which together are commonly referred to as Rixdorf or Alt-Rixdorf ("Old Rixdorf"). The other official neighborhoods are (from north to south):
 Reuterkiez,
 Flughafenstraße,
 Schillerpromenade,
 Rollberg,
 Weiße Siedlung,
 Körnerpark, and
 High-Deck-Siedlung.

Other quarters 
Other city quarters not officially named or recognized as neighborhoods are the Donaukiez along Donaustraße between Sonnenallee and Karl-Marx-Straße, the Weserkiez east of Wildenbruchstraße between Weigandufer and Sonnenallee, the Dammwegsiedlung south of Dammweg, as well as large living quarters north of the Neukölln Ship Canal, and south of the Berlin Hermannstraße and Berlin Neukölln stations. At the western and eastern outskirts there are recreational spaces—a large area of privately leased garden plots in the east, and the park Volkspark Hasenheide with surrounding buildings in the west—while industrial areas have formed mostly to the south and east of the Berlin Ringbahn.

Urban planning 
In urban planning, the divisions of Berlin's boroughs and districts are more precise. Here Neukölln, district 01 in borough 08, is divided into five regions, each of them further compartmentalized into a total of 18 so-called Lebensweltlich orientierte Räume (LOR) ("lifeworld-oriented regions"):
 Schillerpromenade (01) in the west, comprising Hasenheide (15), Wissmannstraße (16), Schillerpromenade (17), and Silbersteinstraße (18);
 Neuköllner Mitte (02) in the center, comprising Flughafenstraße (11), Rollberg (12), Körnerpark (13), and Glasower Straße (14);
 Reuterstraße (03) in the north, comprising Reuterkiez (01), Bouchéstraße (02), and Donaustraße (03);
 Rixdorf (04) in the center to the north-east, comprising Böhmisch-Rixdorf and Richardplatz-Süd as Rixdorf (04), Hertzbergplatz (05), Treptower Straße Nord (06), and the industrial park Ederstraße (07); and
 Köllnische Heide (05) in the east, comprising Weiße Siedlung (08), Schulenburgpark (09) including the High-Deck-Siedlung, and the industrial park Köllnische Heide (10).

History 
In the 12th century the region around modern-day Berlin came under German rule as part of the Margraviate of Brandenburg, founded by Albert the Bear in 1157. The region was originally situated near the borders to the Duchy of Kopanica, ruled by Jaxa of Köpenick, and the Duchy of Pomerania, which had all fought for dominance during the colonization of the Teltow and the formation of Brandenburg (Ostsiedlung). Archeological traces of earlier Slavic settlements were never found.

Early history 
The place later known as Rixdorf was founded around 1200 as a stronghold by the Knights Templar from neighbouring Tempelhove, Merghenvelde and Mergendorp. The Templar functioned as a neutral institution, and when the conflicts had ended, the stronghold was abandoned and eventually converted into a Templar access yard. After Pope Clement V had dissolved the order in 1312, the estate was held by Waldemar the Great for six years, and then transferred to the Protestant Order of Saint John (Johanniterorden) in 1318, still represented today by Neukölln's coat of arms bearing the Maltese cross.

Rixdorf 

When first mentioned in a charter of 26 June 1360, the angerdorf south-east of Berlin around the present-day Richardplatz was called Richarsdorp ("Richard's Village"). The original Rixdorf charter has been lost since World War II, but its contents have been preserved, and the year 1360 is regarded as the official year of Neukölln's foundation. The village was mentioned again in 1375 as Richardstorpp in the Landbuch der Mark Brandenburg. At the beginning of the 15th century, Richarsdorp erected its first chapel. In 1435 the Johannite Order sold their possessions to the cities of Alt-Berlin and Cölln, including Richarsdorp, which was mentioned again in 1525 as Ricksdorf. In 1543 Ricksdorf became the sole possession of Cölln. During the Thirty Years' War (1618–48) Ricksdorf was mostly depopulated, with buildings and the church destroyed by fire. After the city of Cölln merged with Berlin in 1709, the village, then already called Rixdorf, became the possession of Berlin.

Deutsch-Rixdorf and Böhmisch-Rixdorf 
In 1737 King Frederick William I of Prussia allowed about 350 Moravian Protestants expelled from Bohemia to settle near the village, where they built their own church and houses off the village centre along the road to Berlin, today called Richardstraße. The original village of Rixdorf was subsequently called Deutsch-Rixdorf. The new Bohemian village Böhmisch-Rixdorf was granted its own constitution in 1797.

The overall population in 1809 was 695. In the course of industrialization in the 19th century, a network of new streets was laid out as part of the Hobrecht-Plan in an area that came to be known architecturally as the Wilhelmine Ring. On 28 April 1849, more than a quarter of the buildings in both Rixdorf villages were destroyed in a firestorm, and reconstruction lasted until 1853. In 1863 a Turkish cemetery was laid out north of Rixdorf, the successor of a smaller burial ground in Kreuzberg established in 1798 for the Turkish members of the Prussian Army. It contains the mortal remains of the Ottoman ambassador Giritli Ali Aziz Efendi, the exiled Grand Vizier Mehmed Talat and Bahattin Şakir.

In 1867 Deutsch-Rixdorf had a population of 5,000, and Böhmisch-Rixdorf of 1,500. When both villages were united as Rixdorf on 1 January 1874, the new town had 8,000 inhabitants, growing to 15,000 the next year. On 1 April 1899, Rixdorf, then the largest town of Prussia, received the status of an independent city.

Neukölln 
Rixdorf had become notorious for its taverns and amusement sites, and in 1912 the local authorities tried to get rid of this reputation by assuming the name Neukölln, derived from the Neucöllner Siedlungen ("Neucölln Estates") north of Rixdorf, which themselves referenced Neu-Cölln, a historical district south of the medieval part of Berlin and Cölln proper. The renaming was eventually granted by Emperor William I on 27 January 1912. It was during this time that the architect Reinhold Kiehl was called on by the local council to upgrade the city's infrastructure. This has led to some of the area's most iconic buildings being erected, such as the Rathaus Neukölln (city hall) or the Stadtbad Neukölln (public bath).

Neukölln's independence ended in 1920 when it was incorporated into Berlin as part of the Greater Berlin Act and, together with the districts Britz, Rudow and Buckow, formed the new borough of Neukölln, Berlin's 14th (and since the 2001 reform 8th) administrative district. Rixdorf continued to exist, and is today represented by two neighborhoods in the center of Neukölln, Böhmisch-Rixdorf and Richardplatz-Süd. Many of the old landmarks are still intact, and several areas and streets like the Bohemian Kirchgasse have retained their idyllic and rural character.

Berlin-Neukölln 
In the Weimar Republic Neukölln remained a working-class district and communist stronghold. This led to increasing tensions between left-wing radicals like the KPD and the Berlin police, culminating in the Bloody May riots of 1929 (Blutmai). The Nazis viewed the district as "Red Neukölln", and tensions with the rivaling socialist and communist groups ensued as early as November 1926, when Joseph Goebbels sent over 300 men of the Sturmabteilung (SA) on a propaganda march through Neukölln, ending in clashes on the Hermannplatz. The conflict intensified until the end of the republic, leading to occasional armed engagements like the Rixdorf shootout of October 1931, when communists attacked the Richardsburg, a Sturmlokal of the SA. After the National Socialists' rise to power in 1933, the SA extended their campaigns and also targeted rallies and events by moderate parties like the SPD.

From 1945 to 1990, Neukölln was part of the American sector of West Berlin. The Sonnenallee, connecting Neukölln at Hermannplatz with Baumschulenweg in former East Berlin, was the site of a border crossing of the Berlin Wall. During the Cold War Neukölln retained its status as a traditional working-class area and one of Berlin's red-light districts. Many gastarbeiter, especially from Turkey and Greece, settled in Kreuzberg and Neukölln since the 1950s, later followed by Palestinian and Arabic refugees from the Lebanese Civil War. Since the 1970s and 80s, Neukölln, like the neighboring Kreuzberg, has embraced alternative forms of living and an often anti-establishment culture that is still vibrant to this day. In the 1990s late repatriates from formerly Soviet states like Ukraine and Russia resettled in Germany, many of them in Berlin, and in Neukölln specifically.

Following a decade as a typical inner-city hot spot, 21st century Neukölln has experienced an influx of students, creatives and other young professionals of mostly Western origin avoiding higher rents charged in other parts of Berlin. The trend increased after the 2008 financial and 2010 European debt crises, when many young EU citizens left their home countries for Germany in search of work, leading to rapid cultural shifts in certain neighborhoods within Neukölln, especially the neighborhoods to the north and west from Reuter- to Schillerkiez. Coupled with increasing domestic and foreign real estate investments, this has caused gentrification and a knock-on effect of rents to rise in many parts of Neukölln. Conversely, this cosmopolitan evolution has made Neukölln into one of the world's most sought-after neighborhoods to visit and live.

As of 2019, 46% of Neukölln residents were first or second-generation immigrants.

Public transport 

The district is served by three operational sections of urban rail.

U-Bahn:

 U7: Rathaus Spandau ↔ Rudow (running northwest–southeast)
 U8: Wittenau ↔ Hermannstraße (running north–south)

Part of each of the following S-Bahn routes share an east–west-running section of Ringbahn track through the district:

 S41/S42: Südkreuz → Gesundbrunnen → Südkreuz (clockwise ↔ anti clockwise circular)
 S45: Südkreuz ↔ Berlin Schönefeld Flughafen (only from Monday till Friday). An extension of the S45 is projected to run beyond the current terminus at Schönefeld Airport to the under construction Berlin Brandenburg Airport.
 S46: Westend ↔ Königs Wusterhausen
 S47: Spindlersfeld ↔ Hermannstraße

Among the numerous rail stations in the district three act as interchanges:

 Hermannplatz – U7 / U8
 Hermannstraße – U8 / S-Bahn
 Berlin-Neukölln – U7 / S-bahn

Main sights 

 Rixdorf village church, consecrated in 1481, adopted by the Moravian Protestants in 1737, officially called Bethlehem Church since 1912.
 Şehitlik Mosque, on the Turkish cemetery, finished in 2005 by the Turkish-Islamic Union for Religious Affairs (DİTİB).
 Neuköllner Oper: Opera house that hosts a wide range of performances including musicals, baroque opera, operetta, or experimental music theatre. Famous for its aim to bring elitist culture to a wider audience.
 Stadtbad Neukölln, the local swim hall which consists of antique thermal baths inspired by Greek temples and basilicas.
 Körnerpark: Park in neobarock style with fountains, orangerie, exhibition rooms and a cafe, founded 1910 by Franz Körner as a present to Rixdorf.

Notable people

Gallery

International relations 
 Berlin Neukölln is a pilot city of the Council of Europe and the European Commission Intercultural Cities programme.

References

External links 

Localities of Berlin